Lord Clinton may refer to:

Lord Charles Clinton (1813–1894), a British Conservative politician
Lord Robert Clinton (1820–1867), a British Liberal Party politician
Lord Edward Clinton (1836–1907), a British Liberal Party politician
Lord Arthur Clinton (1840–1870), a British Liberal Party politician

Any of the men who held either of the following titles:
Baron Clinton 
Earl of Lincoln (1572 creation) (or their eldest sons who used Lord Clinton as a courtesy title) 

Title and name disambiguation pages